Austria competed at the 1908 Summer Olympics in London, England.  Austrian and Hungarian results at early Olympic Games are generally kept separate despite the union of the two nations as Austria-Hungary at the time.

Medalists

Results by event

Athletics

Fencing

Austria's lone sabreur advanced to the second round before being eliminated.

Swimming

Tennis

Sources
 
 

Nations at the 1908 Summer Olympics
1908
Olympics